Harlan County is the debut studio album by American singer-songwriter Jim Ford. It was released on Sundown Records in 1969, and reissued on Light in the Attic Records in 2011. The album received universal acclaim from critics.

Critical reception

At Metacritic, which assigns a weighted average score out of 100 to reviews from mainstream critics, Harlan County received an average score of 88, based on 7 reviews, indicating "universal acclaim".

Stephen Thomas Erlewine of AllMusic commented that "Harlan County is filled with unassuming, midtempo rockers and ballads, which are either songs about love or driving." He added, "Ford has a pleasant, unremarkable white soul voice that, when combined with the mannered production, tends to undersell the songs, which would have benefited from grittier, committed performances." Andrew Hultkrans of Spin wrote, "A Kentucky-born singer-songwriter once called the 'baddest white man on the planet' by Sly Stone, Jim Ford pioneered a seamless blend of country, soul, and funk on 1969's Harlan County, using a crack studio band that included Elvis guitarist James Burton and Dr. John."

Track listing

Personnel
Credits adapted from liner notes.

 Jim Ford – arrangement (2, 6–8), production
 Lolly Vegas – arrangement (2, 6–8)
 Gene Page – arrangement (1, 3–5, 9, 10)
 Rick Pekkonen – enginnering

References

External links
 

1969 albums
Jim Ford albums
Light in the Attic Records albums
Albums produced by Jim Ford
Albums arranged by Gene Page